Anudamini is an Indian Hindi drama which premiered on DD National on 31 March 2014 to 16 December 2015. It was produced by Raujesh Kumar Jain under the banner of Krish Movies. It starred Sachin Shroff,  Ali Hassan, Supriya Kumari, Deepali Sahay, Neetu Singh, Shyam Mashalkar, and Raujesh Kumar Jain.

Plot 

Anudamini is a story of a small town girl, who has never stepped out of her village. She is placed in a sophisticated background after her marriage to the character Dev, and struggles to cope with the different lifestyle and acceptance from her husband and family.

Broadcast 

Anudamini daily soap is first aired between 2014–15 and the opera re-aired at DD1 in 2016. The Serial is Again re-telecasting at DD National in 2021–22.

Cast

 Sachin Shroff as Dev
 Ali Hassan as Manoj
 Supriya Kumari as Anudamini
 Mitali Nag
 Neha Bam
 Rohit Mehta as Rahul
 Neetu Singh
 Deepali Sahay
 Neena Singh
 Mahesh Mashalkar
 Sudeepti Parmar
 Shilpi Shukla
 Ekta Methai
 Abhayshankar Jha
 Shyam Mashalkar
 Sagar Saini
 Raujesh Kumar Jain

References

Indian television sitcoms
2014 Indian television series debuts
Indian drama television series
DD National original programming